Paul-Charles-Amable de Bourgoing (1791–1864) was a French diplomat credited with inventing the process "email ombrant" (pottery decorating) of lithophanes in 1827 in France.

References

1791 births
1834 deaths
French Senators of the Second Empire
19th-century French diplomats
Grand Officiers of the Légion d'honneur
Burials at Père Lachaise Cemetery